Coleophora parki is a moth of the family Coleophoridae.

References 

parki
Moths described in 2002